The Chausath Yogini temples in India include:

 Chausath Yogini Temple, Hirapur, Odisha
 Chausath Yogini Temple, Ranipur Jharial, Odisha
 Chausath Yogini Temple, Jabalpur, Madhya Pradesh
 Chausath Yogini temple, Khajuraho, Madhya Pradesh
 Chausath Yogini Temple, Morena, Madhya Pradesh